This list of University of Toronto alumni includes notable graduates, non-graduate former students, and current students of University of Toronto, located in Toronto, Ontario, Canada.

To avoid redundancy, alumni who hold or have held faculty positions in the University of Toronto are placed on this list of alumni, and do not appear on the list of faculty. Individuals are ordered by the year of their first degree from the university.

For graduates of the Faculty of Arts and Science, college and satellite campus affiliations, if known, are indicated after degree years, with shorthands used for University College (U.C.), University of Trinity College (Trin.), Victoria University (Vic.), University of St. Michael's College (St.M.), Innis College (Innis), New College (New), Knox College (Knox), Regis College (Regis), Wycliffe College (Wyc.), Woodsworth College (Wdw.), Massey College (Massey), Scarborough Campus (UTSC) and Mississauga Campus (UTM).

Nobel laureates

Government

Heads of state and government

International

Governors-general and prime ministers

Supreme Court judges

Lieutenant-governors, premiers and mayors

Ministers, diplomats, party leaders and other political figures

Natural sciences, mathematics, medicine and engineering

Mathematics and statistics

Medicine and dentistry
{{columns-list|colwidth=20em|
Anderson Ruffin Abbott (M.D. 1861) – first Black Canadian doctor, participated in the American Civil War
Albert Ernest Archer (M.D.) – physician and political activist, President of the Canadian Medical Association, 1942–43
Elizabeth Bagshaw (M.B.) – medical director of the first birth control clinic in Canada
Michael Baker (M.D. 1966) – physician and cancer researcher, Physician-in-Chief of the Toronto General Hospital, recipient of the Queen Elizabeth II Golden Jubilee Medal
Donald Balfour (M.B. 1906, M.D. 1914) – surgeon and co-founder of the Mayo Clinic
Ernest Black Struthers (B.A. 1910, M.B. 1912) – physician, professor, and medical missionary, noted for his research on kala- azar and missionary work for the London Missionary Society, Cheeloo University, and Severance Union Medical College 
Frederick Banting (M.B. 1916) – co-discoverer of insulin, with student Charles Best, co-researcher James Collip and professor of physiology John James Richard Macleod
Frieda Fraser (B.A. 1922, M.B. 1925) - researcher in infectious diseases and Professor of Microbiology at the University of Toronto
Henry J. M. Barnett (M.D. 1944) – pioneer of the use of aspirin as a preventive therapy for heart attack and stroke
Staff Barootes (M.D. 1943) – physician and urologist, former treasurer and deputy president of the Canadian Medical Association
John Basmajian (M.D. 1945) – physician, noted for his work in rehabilitation science, taught at Queen's University at Kingston, Emory University and McMaster University
Sheela Basrur (M.D. 1982) – Chief Medical Officer of Health and Assistant Deputy Minister of Public Health in the Ontario Ministry of Health and Long-Term Care, 2004–06
Gordon Bell (M.D. 1943) – drug and alcohol addiction researcher and founder of Donwood Institute and Bellwood Health Services
Charles Best (B.A. 1921, M.D. 1925) – student of Frederick Banting in the discovery of insulin; later adviser to the medical research committee of the World Health Organization
Norman Bethune (M.D. 1916) – physician and humanitarian; developed the first blood transfusion service in the Spanish Civil War, doctor to Mao Zedong's army in the Second Sino-Japanese War
Wilfred Gordon Bigelow (M.D. 1938) – heart surgeon who developed the artificial pacemaker and the use of hypothermia in open heart surgery
Francis John Blatherwick (D.PH. 1975) – one of Canada's trailblazing leaders in public health, the longest-serving medical health officer in Canada
Susan Bradley (M.D. 1966) – psychiatrist best known for her work in gender identity disorder in children, former Psychiatrist-in-Chief at the Hospital for Sick Children
John Callaghan (M.D. 1946) – cardiac surgeon who "pioneered open-heart surgery in Alberta"
Kevin Chan (B.Sc.) – emergency physician at the Hospital for Sick Children, expert in pediatric population health
Christopher Chetsanga (M.Sc. 1965, Ph.D. 1969) – professor of the University of Zimbabwe who discovered two DNA repair enzymes
Brock Chisholm (M.D. 1924) – Director-General of the World Health Organization, 1948–53
Charles Kirk Clarke (M.D. 1879) – psychiatrist who co-founded the Canadian National Committee for Mental Hygiene (now the Canadian Mental Health Association)
James Collip (B.A. 1912 Trin., M.A. 1913, Ph.D. 1916) – significant member of the research team that discovered insulin; later served as the Chair of the Department of Biochemistry at McGill University and Dean of Medicine at the University of Western Ontario
Harold Copp (M.D. 1939) – biochemist who discovered and named calcitonin, a hormone used in the treatment of hypercalcemia and osteoporosis
Thomas Stephen Cullen (M.B. 1890) – gynecologist associated with Johns Hopkins Hospital; Cullen's sign is named for him
Robert Defries (M.D. 1913) – physician; former director of Connaught Medical Research Laboratories
Theodore Drake (M.B. 1914) – pediatrician and nutrition expert; inventor of the baby food Pablum with Frederick Tisdall at the Hospital for Sick Children
Jessie Gray (B.Sc. 1931, M.D. 1934, Ch.M. 1939) – surgeon, lecturer, and researcher
Larry Goldenberg (M.D. 1978) – pioneer in the role of MRI and focal therapy in the treatment of prostate cancer
Brian Goldman (M.D. 1980) – doctor and radio personality; practices at Mount Sinai Hospital; produces a radio documentary series, White Coat, Black Art
Duncan Archibald Graham (M.B. 1905) – physician and academic, Physician-in-Chief at the Toronto General Hospital until 1947
Arthur Ham (M.B. 1927) – prominent histologist, Fellow of the Royal Society of Canada, textbook Histology'
Raymond Heimbecker (M.D. 1947) – cardiovascular surgeon who performed the world's first complete heart valve transplant in 1962 and Canada's first modern heart transplant in 1981
Jack Hirsh (D.Sc.) – clinician, and scientist specializing in anticoagulant therapy and thrombosis, fellow of the Royal Society of Canada
Sophie Jamal (M.D. 1991, Ph.D. 2002) – clinician-scientist who incited one of Canada's largest scientific misconduct cases
Harold E. Johns (M.A., Ph.D. 1939) – medical physicist who developed of the use of ionizing radiation to treat cancer
Victor Ling (B.Sc. 1966) – medical researcher known for the discovery of P-glycoprotein
John Joseph Mackenzie (B.Sc. 1886 U.C., professor of pathology and bacteriology) – pathologist and bacteriologist, member of the Society of American Bacteriologists and the American Association of Pathologists and Bacteriologists
Florence McConney (B.A., 1917, M.D., 1920), physician and Chief of Medicine at Women's College Hospital
Thomas McCrae (M.D. 1903) – Professor of Medicine at Jefferson Medical College, collaborated with William Osler on The Principles and Practice of MedicineErnest McCulloch (M.D. 1948) – cellular biologist and Lasker Award recipient credited with the discovery of the stem cell
Robert McMurtry (M.D. 1965) – physician, special advisor to the Canadian Royal Commission on the Future of Health Care
Maud Menten (B.A. 1904, M.B. 1907, M.D. 1911) – major contributor to enzyme kinetics and histochemistry, for whom the Michaelis–Menten equation is named
Thomas Mills (B.A. 1871 U.C., M.A. 1872) – physician and physiologist, taught at McGill University, fellow of the Royal Society of Canada
Ken Money (B.Sc. 1958, M.Sc. 1959, Ph.D. 1961) – astronaut and physiologist, retired from Defence and Civil Institute of Environmental Medicine now known as Defence Research and Development Canada
James Fraser Mustard (M.D. 1953) – physician and scientist, a founding member of the McMaster University's Faculty of Medicine, past Chairman of Ballard Power Systems
William Thornton Mustard (M.D. 1937) – physician and cardiac surgeon, one of the first to perform open-heart surgery, well known for Mustard cardiovascular procedure
Jack Newman (M.D. 1970) – physician specializing in breastfeeding support and advocacy, consultant for Unicef's Baby Friendly Hospital Initiative
Robert Noble (M.D. 1934) – physician who was involved in the discovery of vinblastine, recipient of the Gairdner Foundation International Award
James Orbinski (M.A. 1998, associate professor of medicine) – President of Médecins Sans Frontières; fellow at the Munk Centre for International Studies
Oronhyatekha (M.D. 1866) – first Canadian Aboriginal medical graduate, former President of the Grand Council of Canadian Chiefs
Nancy Olivieri (B.Sc.) – prominent Toronto haematologist and researcher with an interest in the treatment of haemoglobinopathies.
Jennie Smillie Robertson (M.B. 1909) – first female surgeon in Canada
Robert B. Salter (M.D. 1947) – pediatric orthopaedic surgeon who originated the continuous passive motion (CPM) treatment to aid the recovery of joints after trauma
Ricky Kanee Schachter (M.B. 1943, associate professor) – dermatologist, former president of the Canadian Dermatological Association
Peter A. Singer (M.D. 1984) – former director of the University of Toronto Joint Centre for Bioethics and member of the scientific advisory board of the Bill & Melinda Gates Foundation
Elizabeth Stern (M.D. 1939) – professor of epidemiology at the University of California, Los Angeles who published the first case report linking a virus to a cancer
Augusta Stowe-Gullen (M.D. 1883) – first female Canadian doctor, awarded the Order of British Empire
James Thorburn (M.B.) – physician and university professor, consulting surgeon at the Toronto General Hospital, President of the Canadian Medical Association, 1895
Stephen Ticktin (M.D. 1973) – psychiatrist, therapist and lecturer, notable figure in the anti-psychiatry movement
Ross Upshur (M.Sc. 1997) – physician and researcher, Director of the Primary Care Research Unit at Sunnybrook Research Institute
Paul Walfish (M.D. 1958) – endocrinologist, noted for his research in thyroid physiology and pathology, worked at Mount Sinai Hospital
Derrick Rossi (B.Sc.) – The Founder of the biotechnology company Moderna
Donald Redelmeier (B.Sc. 1980, M.D. 1984) - internist, Professor of Medicine at University of Toronto and expert in decision science. 
}}

Physics, chemistry and astronomy

Biology and ecology

Engineering and computer science

Earth science

Social sciences

Anthropology, geography and archaeology

Sociology
Simone Browne (Ph.D. 2007; professor of sociology at University of Texas), author of Dark Matters: On the Surveillance of BlacknessJean Burnet (B.A. Vic.) – sociologist specializing in ethnic studies, founder of the Glendon Sociology Department at York University
Samuel Delbert Clark (Ph.D. 1938; professor of sociology, 1938–76) – sociologist known for studies on Canadian social development and political economics
Erving Goffman (B.A. 1945) – sociologist, author of The Presentation of Self in Everyday Life'', taught at Cal and UPenn, 73rd president of the American Sociological Association
Daniel G. Hill (M.A. 1951, Ph.D. 1960) – sociologist, human rights specialist and Black Canadian historian, Ontario Ombudsman, 1984–89, founder of the Ontario Black History Society
Himani Bannerji (Ph.D.) – writer, academic, professor of sociology at York University, known for her activist work and poetry
Barry Wellman (Ph.D. 1969) – Director of NetLab and retired S.D. Clark Professor of Sociology at the University of Toronto, Fellow Royal Society of Canada
Elliott Leyton (Ph.D. 1972) – sociologist, educator and author on serial homicide and juvenile delinquency

Psychology and linguistics

Economics, management and political science

Humanities

Philosophy

Literature

History

Law (excluding the Supreme Court judges mentioned above)

Theology

Media and arts

Journalism and publishing

Film, television, radio, and theatre

Music, fine arts and architecture

Education

Business

Humanitarianism, social work and others

Athletics

References

External links
Nobel Laureates who were based at the University of Toronto at significant points in their careers

University of Toronto people
University of Toronto alumni
Toronto
Toronto-related lists